Brontispalaelaps is a genus of mites in the family Ameroseiidae. There are at least two described species in Brontispalaelaps.

Species
These two species belong to the genus Brontispalaelaps:
 Brontispalaelaps leveri Womersley, 1956
 Brontispalaelaps marianneae Halliday, 1997

References

Ameroseiidae
Articles created by Qbugbot